James Stuart Pressdee (19 June 1933 – 20 July 2016) was a Welsh first class cricketer. He was a left-arm spinner and aggressive right-handed batsman. He also played association football in the Football League and Welsh Football League where he played as a left-back.

Football career
He won a Welsh youth cap at football and was on the books at Swansea Town where provided reliable defensive cover. He turned professional at the Vetch Field in August 1951. He was given his League debut in Swansea's 2–0 defeat at home to Everton in March 1954, making eight Second Division appearances before concentrating on his cricket career. He also had spells with Brecon Corinthians and Llanelly in the Welsh Football League.

Cricket career
Pressdee made his debut for Glamorgan against Nottinghamshire at Cardiff Arms Park when just 16 years of age, making him the county's youngest player in the post-war period.

A regular in the Glamorgan team from 1955 onwards, Pressdee scored a thousand runs in a season on six occasions, with 1911 in 1962 being his best. He scored 13 centuries including one for North-Eastern Transvaal. Playing 322 games for Glamorgan CCC between 1949 and 1965.

Pressdee was an inconsistent bowler. Having taken 71 wickets in 1955, he captured only 54 during the next seven seasons, but then in 1963 and 1964 he came to prominence as an all-rounder, completing the double (1000 runs and 100 wickets) in each season. In 1965, he took 9 for 43 against Yorkshire at Swansea. Pressdee emigrated to South Africa in 1965 where he played for North-Eastern Transvaal until 1969–70. He won the South African Cricket Annual Cricketer of the Year award in 1966 after taking 33 wickets.

Pressdee returned to Wales in the 1980s and captained the Glamorgan Colts side in the South Wales Cricket Association.

References

External links

1933 births
2016 deaths
Welsh cricketers
Northerns cricketers
Glamorgan cricketers
Marylebone Cricket Club cricketers
A. E. R. Gilligan's XI cricketers
Swansea City A.F.C. players
Brecon Corinthians F.C. players
Llanelli Town A.F.C. players
English Football League players
Welsh footballers
Wales youth international footballers
Association football fullbacks